Lights and Offerings is the first studio album by British synthpop band Mirrors. The album was released in the UK on 28 February 2011 and on 18 March 2011 in Europe.

The title comes from the Mirrors song "Lights and Offerings" which was a B-side of their 2009 single "Into the Heart". The song was re-recorded during their album sessions in June 2010, but never mixed or finished for inclusion on the album.

Most songs were already written and demoed in 2009. The songs "Secrets" and "Hide and Seek" originally started as Mumm-Ra songs, written by James New. "Secrets" was later transformed into a 14 minutes song though the band decided to edit the track down to 10 minutes due to pressure from the record label. Mirrors released a few demos in 2009 and 2010 of songs that would later appear on the album, being "Hide and Seek", "Organ Song" (which would be re-titled to "Write Through the Night"), "Searching in the Wilderness", "Look at Me", "Into the Heart", "Fear of Drowning" and "Somewhere Strange".

Overview
A number of different releases have been issued so far by three record labels.

Skint Records releases:
 The full album on CD.
 The full album on CD in a promotional box with two extra 7" singles, a press sheet and promotional photo. Limited to 300 copies of which approx 60 copies were destroyed due to the stencilling process and approx 40 were put up for sale at Skint Records.
 The full album on CD in the same promo box, though made for purchase by the public. This box is numbered inside the lid and comes with two additional 7" singles. Limited to approx 40 numbered copies.
 The full album on CD, coming with an exclusive bonus CD. Three different bonus CDs were made, to be sold exclusively through RecordStore.co.uk (catalogue number MIRRORS004), RoughTrade (MIRRORS005) and Skint Records (MIRRORS006, pre-order only).
 The full album as a double 12" vinyl with two bonus tracks, released on 3 May 2011 through the Skint Records webshop and 24 May 2011 through all big online retailers.
 The album was digitally released in France on 3 May 2011 with 6 bonus tracks. The album features French album and song titles, though the songs are the common English versions.
 The album was digitally re-released in October 2011 with three bonus tracks.
PIAS release:
 The full album on CD with two bonus tracks, being "Visions of You" and "Perfectly Still". This CD was only released in Germany.
Undo Records release:
 The full album on CD with a bonus CD, only issued in Greece. Both discs are featured in a digipack with a black slipcase. The bonus disc contains some B-side and remixes. Released on 16 May 2011, although copies were not shipped out until end of June due to issues at the pressing plant.

There is furthermore a digital release which contains the full album on iTunes with an additional seven bonus tracks and five videos, including a live performance in Hamburg from 2010 and an album commentary.

A promotional CD was made available through a Facebook competition in March 2011 featuring the Hamburg live performance from 2010 which was also available on iTunes. This promotional item however also includes an additional track being the intro of the concert.

Track listing

B-sides and other tracks

"Broken by Silence" - B-side to digital download and 7" version of "Ways to an End" single.
"Of the Night and the Light and the Half Light" - bonus track on the "Ways to an End" iTunes release. The music comes from the video with the same name.
"Toe the Line" - B-side to digital download and 7" version of "Hide and Seek" single.
"Falls by Another Name" - B-side to digital download and 7" version of "Into the Heart" 2011 single.

Personnel
 James New
 Ally Young
 James Arguile
 Josef Page

References

External links
 Official website
 Skint Records website
 Mirrors discography

2011 debut albums